Nosie Katzmann (born Jürgen Katzmann in 1959) is a German dance music songwriter and producer.

He is known for writing songs for several European electronic dance acts like Culture Beat and Captain Hollywood Project, for whom he contributed various chart hits, among them "Mr. Vain", "More and More" and others. "More and More" was his first No. 1 in Germany. In 1993, "Mr. Vain" became his biggest hit so far, topping the charts in Germany, Austria, Switzerland and the UK.

Discography

Solo
Greatest Hits 1 (2008)
Greatest Hits 2 (2010)
Katzmann (2014)

Writing / production credits

References

External links
Nosie Katzmann on Eurodance Encyclopædia

German songwriters
German dance musicians
Living people
1959 births
People from Bad Neustadt an der Saale